Eloísa Ibarra (born 1968) is a Uruguayan visual artist who has been recognized for her graphic works.

Biography
Ibarra studied graphic design at the Figari School, and was trained at the National Institute of Fine Arts.

In 2013 and 2014, her exhibition "The Seed of Babel" toured cities in the United States. It explores changes in language, as illustrated by artistic prints alongside repeated machine translations of Jorge Luis Borges's short story "The Library of Babel".

In 2017, Ibarra's exhibition "Mesura y Abismo" was shown at the Juan Manuel Blanes Museum in Montevideo. That year she was also invited to be an artist-in-residence at the SEA Foundation in Tilburg, The Netherlands.

Awards
 Honorable Mention for Painting, 2nd Mosca Hnos Biennial of Youth Arts (2001)
 National Honorable Mention, International Salon of Engraving, Integrated (2005)
 Special Mention, Painting Salon del Vino, INAVI, Montevideo, Uruguay (2005)
 1st Prize Sculpture, Zitarrosa Foundation Award (2006)
 3rd National Salon of Engraving, Lolita Rubia Foundation, Minas, Uruguay (2006)
 National Visual Arts Award (2016)

References

External links
 

1968 births
Living people
20th-century Uruguayan women artists
21st-century Uruguayan women artists
20th-century engravers
20th-century Uruguayan painters
21st-century engravers
Uruguayan graphic designers
People from Montevideo
Uruguayan women painters
Women engravers
Women graphic designers